Sherine Wong Sook Ling (born 28 March 1979) is a Malaysian model, winner of Miss Malaysia Universe in 1998 and represented Malaysia in the Miss Universe 1998. She is currently a full pledge model in Hong Kong.

Personal life 
Born on 28 March 1979, Sherine Wong grew up in Kuala Lumpur. During her high school days, she was excelled in athletics. She represented her school and Malaysia in triple jumps and long jumps competition. She graduated in 2005 with Bachelor of Business & Commerce at Monash University, Australia.

Beauty pageants

Miss Malaysia Universe 1998 
Standing at 5'9', when she was just 18 years old, Wong participated in Miss Malaysia/Universe 1998 pageants. She was crowned as the Miss Malaysia/Universe 1998 winner at Kota Kinabalu, Sabah where the final round of the pageant was held. She represented Malaysia in the Miss Universe 1998 pageant in Hawaii.

Miss Asia 2004 
After winning the title of Miss Malaysia Universe 1998, Wong started off as fashion model Malaysia, then Singapore and finally landed herself in Hong Kong in the year of 2004. She participated in the Miss Asia 2004 which was organised by the ATV. Despite she did not win the pageant, she was one of the top favourites, placed in the Top 8 and won the Miss Photogenic and Perfect Skin titles.

Career 
Since she started off as a runway model, Wong has worked for some renowned international brands such as Prada, Christian Dior, Chanel, and Cartier in Hong Kong, Taiwan, Singapore and Malaysia. With degrees in Bachelor of Business and Commerce, she had the ambition to become an entrepreneur where she invested in a club in Hong Kong. However the club were sold due to the world economy crisis in 2008.

She eventually threw herself back into modelling with full force and landed into some prestigious endorsement deals, TV commercials, event host and even starred in music videos with famous cantopop singers Hacken Lee and Eric Suen. She started to take the Hong Kong market by storm and now expanding to greater China which she saw as a big market with many opportunities.

Sherine would later possess talents in acting and singing. She was once starred in a 2005 movie called Scary Incident (恐怖事件) alongside Hong Kong actor Mark Cheng, who is the main lead actor.

In 2011, she worked towards releasing her first EP and photobook, after being inspired and praised by the Hong Kong-based Swedish musician, Anders Nelsson.

Wong also starred in a 2013 independent Japanese film Fly Me to Minami.

She eventually released her first EP in 2018.

Filmography
Films

Discography
EP

References

External links 
 
 The Star
 Miss Asia 2004
 

1979 births
Living people
Malaysian beauty pageant winners
Malaysian emigrants to Hong Kong
Malaysian female models
Malaysian people of Cantonese descent
Miss Universe 1998 contestants
People from Kuala Lumpur